The 2021–22 PFC CSKA Moscow season was the club's 111th season in existence and the 30th consecutive season in the top flight of Russian football. In addition to the domestic league, CSKA Moscow participate in this season's edition of the Russian Cup.

Season events
On 15 June, Ivica Olić left his role as Head Coach of CSKA Moscow by mutual consent, with Aleksei Berezutski being made Acting Head Coach. A little over a month later, 19 July, Berezutski was confirmed as CSKA's new permanent head coach.

Summer Transfers
On 28 May, Maksim Mukhin became CSKA Moscow's first signing of the summer, penning a five-year contract after joining from Lokomotiv Moscow.

On 31 May, CSKA Moscow announced the signing of Anton Zabolotny from Sochi, on a contract until 2024.

On 1 July, CSKA Moscow announced that Nikita Kotin had left the club by mutual consent, whilst Vitaly Zhironkin joined Volgar Astrakhan on loan for the season the following day.

On 6 July, young midfielders Anton Krachkovsky, Sergei Pryakhin and Andrei Savinov all joined Kairat Moscow on loan for the season, whilst Krachkovsky also extended his contract with CSKA Moscow until May 2024 and Savinov extended his until May 2025.

On 9 July, Ilya Shkurin joined Dynamo Kyiv on a season-long loan deal.

On 13 July, Vadim Konyukhov signed a new contract with CSKA Moscow until the end of the 2024–25 season, and then joined Zvezda Perm on a season-long loan deal.

On 19 July, Maksim Yeleyev moved to Amkar Perm on loan for the season.

On 30 July, Arnór Sigurðsson joined to Venezia on loan for the season.

New Contracts
On 1 June, CSKA Moscow extended their contract with Tigran Avanesyan until the summer of 2026.

On 9 June, Ilya Pomazun extended his contract with CSKA Moscow until the summer of 2026, and then moved to Ural Yekaterinburg on loan for the season.

On 16 June, Gocha Gogrichiani extended his contract with CSKA Moscow for another year, until the summer of 2022, and then moved to Tekstilshchik Ivanovo on loan for the season.

On 17 June, CSKA Moscow announced that Ivan Lapshov and Artur Galoyan had joined their training camp in Austria on trial.

On 19 July, Kirill Nababkin signed a new one-year contract with CSKA after his previous contract had expired at the end of the 2020–21 season.

On 22 July, Alan Dzagoev signed a new two-year contract with CSKA after his previous contract had expired at the end of the 2020–21 season.

July
CSKA opened the season with a home fixture against FC Ufa on 25 July, which they won 1-0 thanks to a second half goal from debutante Anton Zabolotny.

On 30 July, CSKA hosted the first Moscow Derby of the season, against Lokomotiv Moscow. Kristijan Bistrović gave CSKA the lead from a free-kick in the 19th minute before Fyodor Smolov equalised three minutes later. On the hour mark Rifat Zhemaletdinov gave Lokomotiv the lead, which they would hold to the end, leaving CSKA with a 2–1 defeat.

August
On 4 August, CSKA confirmed that Nair Tiknizyan had left the club to join Lokomotiv Moscow.

On 8 August, CSKA travelled to the VTB Arena to face Dynamo Moscow. After Chidera Ejuke gave CSKA the lead in the 8th minute, CSKA held the lead until the 58th minute, when Jaka Bijol fouled Arsen Zakharyan in the area and Daniil Fomin stepped up to score the penalty. Fomin scored Dynamo's second in the 73 minute with Dynamo holding on to win 2–1.

On 14 August, CSKA played their second away game in a row, this time at the Rostov Arena against Rostov. Jaka Bijol opened the scoring in the 8th minute, with Fyodor Chalov doubling CSKA's advantage in the 36th. In the second half, Danil Glebov scored for Rostov in the 54th minute before Konstantin Maradishvili scored his first goal for CSKA in the 89th minute and secured all three points for CSKA.

On 21 August, CSKA hosted Akhmat Grozny at the VEB Arena. After Yevgeni Kharin was sent off for Akhmat Grozny in the first half, Vladislav Yakovlev gave CSKA the lead with his first goal for the club in the 71st minute. Chidera Ejuke doubled CSKA's lead four minutes later, with the game ending 2–0 to CSKA.

CSKA's last game of August took place on 26 August, away to Zenit St.Petersburg at the Krestovsky Stadium. A late strike from Sardar Azmoun saw Zenit run out 1-0 winners.

On 30 August, Argentine striker Adolfo Gaich left CSKA to sign for Huesca on a season-long loan deal, whilst the next day, 31 August, Nikola Vlašić left CSKA to sign permanently for West Ham United.

September
On 2 September, Konstantin Maradishvili left CSKA to sign for Lokomotiv Moscow.

On 7 September, Vadim Karpov, Tigran Avanesyan and Lassana N'Diaye all joined Tekstilshchik Ivanovo on season-long loan deals.

On 12 September, CSKA traveled to the Arsenal Stadium to face Arsenal Tula. Igor Diveyev gave CSKA the lead after 5 minutes, with Yevgeni Markov equalising for Arsenal Tula in the 18th minute. Ivan Novoseltsev gave Arsenal the lead in the 66th minute before Fyodor Chalov equalising for CSKA 8 minutes later, with the game ending in a 2–2 draw.

On 20 September, CSKA hosted Spartak Moscow in the Main Moscow derby, with Anton Zabolotny scoring the only goal of the game in the 81st minute, before being sentoff for two bookings in injury time.

On 27 September, CSKA travelled to the Nizhny Novgorod Stadium to face Nizhny Novgorod. Bakhtiyar Zaynutdinov gave CSKA the lead in the 31st minute, with Ilzat Akhmetov scoring a second half penalty to secure a 2–0 victory for CSKA.

October
On 2 October, CSKA hosted Krasnodar in a 0–0 draw, that left CSKA 6th in the league going into the International break.

CSKA returned to RPL action against Ural Yekaterinburg on 17 October, winning 1-0 thanks to Chidera Ejuke's third goal of the season.

On 23 October, CSKA hosted Krylia Sovetov, and after being 0-1 down at halftime after an Ivan Sergeyev goal, Chidera Ejuke equalised just before the hour mark. Fyodor Chalov and Anton Zabolotny then scored two late goals to ensure CSKA won the match 3–1.

On 30 October, CSKA traveled to the Ak Bars Arena in Kazan to face Rubin Kazan, Mikhail Kostyukov scoring a stoppage winner for the hosts to leave CSKA in 5th position after 13 games.

November
CSKA lost there second game in a row on 6 November, suffering a 4–1 defeat to Sochi at the Fisht Olympic Stadium. After being 3-0 down at half time, to goals from Artur Yusupov and a brace from Mateo Cassierra, Bakhtiyar Zaynutdinov pulled one goal back in the 57th minute before Igor Yurganov retorted Sochi's three goal advantage late on to secure the win.

On 8 November, Cédric Gogoua left CSKA by mutual consent.

On 21 November, CSKA hosted Khimki in their 15th round match of the Premier League at the VEB Arena. In the 15th minute Bruno Fuchs was shown a straight red card for a professional foul on Kemal Ademi inside the penalty box. Ademi missed the ensuing penalty, with the match end as a 0–0 draw.

On 28 November, CSKA lost 0–2 to Zenit St.Petersburg to end the month in 6th position after a month where they gained 1 point from a possible 9.

December
On 4 December, CSKA traveled to Samara to face Krylia Sovetov at the Solidarnost Arena. After a goalless first half, substitute Emil Bohinen popped up in the 75th minute to score the only goal of the match, and earn CSKA the three points.

On 11 December, CSKA played their final match before the winter break, beating Arsenal Tula 2-0 thanks to goals in each half from Anton Zabolotny, leaving CSKA 4th in the table at the break.

On 30 December, young forward Mikhail Zabotkin joined Albacete Balompié on loan for the remainder of the season, with the option for the move to be made permanent. Also on 30 December, Danila Bokov extended his contract with the club until the summer of 2023, and Vladislav Torop extended his contract until the summer of 2026.

January
On 12 January, midfielder Kristijan Bistrović joined Fatih Karagümrük on loan for the remainder of the season, with an option for the move to be made permanent.

On 17 January, CSKA announced the signing of Paraguayan midfielder Jesús Medina on a contract until the end of the 2024/25 season, after his New York City FC contract had expired. Two days later, 19 January, CSKA announced the signing of Yusuf Yazıcı on loan from Lille until the end of the season, with the option to make the transfer permanent.

On 26 January, Konstantin Kuchayev joined Rubin Kazan on loan for the remainder of the season, whilst Vitaly Zhironkin joined Kairat Moscow on loan for the remainder of the season the following day.

On 31 January, Emil Bohinen joined Salernitana on loan for the remainder of the season, with an option to make the move permanent at the end of the season.

February
On 1 February, Fyodor Chalov joined Basel on loan for the remainder of the season.

On 17 February, Lassana N'Diaye joined Arda Kardzhali on loan for the remainder of the season, with an option for the move to be made permanent.

On 18 February, CSKA announced the loan signing of Jorge Carrascal from River Plate until the end of the season.

On 21 February, CSKA announced the loan signing of Jean-Philippe Gbamin from Everton until the end of the season. The following day, 22 February, Viktor Vasin left the club to join Kairat on a permanent transfer, and Maksim Yeleyev joined Tekstilshchik Ivanovo for the remainder of the season.

On 23 February, CSKA were hit by sanctions from the United States Department of the Treasury as a reaction to the ongoing 2021–2022 Russo-Ukrainian crisis.

CSKA returned to RPL action on 26 February, defeating Spartak Moscow 2-0 at the Otkritie Arena, with goals from debutant Yusuf Yazıcı and Bakhtiyar Zaynutdinov.

On 27 February, Ilya Shkurin's loan to Dynamo Kyiv was cut short, and he joined Raków Częstochowa on loan for the remainder of the season, with an option to make the move permanent.

March
On 5 March, Yusuf Yazıcı scored an injury time winner to see CSKA defeat 10-man Nizhny Novgorod at the VEB Arena. Seven days later, 12 March, CSKA faced Lokomotiv Moscow at the RZD Arena for the fifth Moscow derby of the season. CSKA took the lead in the 39th minute through Yusuf Yazıcı scoring his third league goal in three games, before Wilson Isidor equalised just before half time. Mário Fernandes then scored his first goal of the season in stoppage time at the end of the match to secure CSKA's fifth league win in a row.

On 20 March, CSKA hosted Rubin Kazan at the VEB Arena. Yusuf Yazıcı gave CSKA an early lead, followed by goals from Jean-Philippe Gbamin, Jesús Medina and Jorge Carrascal saw CSKA 4-0 up inside 30 minutes, before Konstantin Kuchayev got one back for Rubin and Aleksandr Lomovitsky was sentoff for two bookable offences before half time. In the second half Yazıcı completed his Hattrick whilst Silvije Begić was also sentoff for two bookable offences, to see the game end 6-1 to CSKA over 9-man Rubin.

April
On 3 April, CSKA hosted Ural Yekaterinburg at the VEB Arena. Igor Diveyev opened the scoring after 3 minutes before a Jaka Bijol own goal levelled the scores after 7 minutes. Eric Bicfalvi then gave Ural the lead mid-way through the second half before an injury time Penalty from Yusuf Yazıcı rescued a point for CSKA. CSKA followed this draw up with a trip to the Arena Khimki where they were defeated 4-2 to by Khimki. CSKA held a 2-1 lead at half time after a goals from Yegor Ushakov and Yusuf Yazıcı cancelled out Ilya Sadygov's first half strike for Khimki. In the second half a brace from Aleksandr Rudenko and a goal from Besard Šabović gave Khimki the win. On 16 April, CSKA travelled to the BetBoom Arena to face Ufa, where a late goal from Mário Fernandes seemed to have giving CSKA the victory, before Aleksei Nikitin scored in injury time for Ufa to share the points. On 24 April, CSKA hosted rivals Dynamo Moscow at the VEB Arena, where a second-half goal from substitute Chidera Ejuke gave CSKA the victory.

May
On 1 May, CSKA travelled to the Akhmat-Arena to face Akhmat Grozny, where goals in the second half from Daniil Utkin and Bernard Berisha saw CSKA suffer a 2-0 defeat to leave them 4th in the table. On 7 May, CSKA host Sochi at the VEB Arena where an early first half goal from Artyom Makarchuk proved decisive in giving Sochi the win and extended the gap between the two teams to 5 points. On 15 May, CSKA travelled to Krasnodar, where a 1-0 defeat saw them drop to fifth in the table.

On 18 May, Mário Fernandes announced that he would be suspending his contract with CSKA following the last game of the season against Rostov on 21 May 2022, in order to spend some time in Brazil with his family and then return to CSKA when ready. He explained that he needs to spend some time in Brazil with the family, but he is not terminating the contract and will return to CSKA if he feels ready.

On 20 May, CSKA announced that Alan Dzagoev and Hörður Magnússon would both leave the club at the end of the season, whilst new contracts had been signed with Kirill Nababkin for an additional year, with Igor Akinfeev until the summer of 2024 and Yegor Ushakov until the summer of 2026. Additionally, CSKA announced the permanent signing of Jorge Carrascal from River Plate after a successful loan period.

CSKA ended the season on 21 May with a 4-0 victory over Rostov with the goals coming from Mário Fernandes, Jean-Philippe Gbamin, Ivan Oblyakov and Igor Diveyev, to see CSKA end the season in 5th position.

June
On 8 June, CSKA announced that Vladislav Yakovlev had extended his contract with the club until the summer of 2025. The following day, 9 June, CSKA announced that Tigran Avanesyan would join Baltika Kaliningrad for the upcoming season. On 10 June, CSKA announced that Ilzat Akhmetov, has left the club with the expiration of his contract.

Squad

Out on loan

Transfers

In

Loans in

Out

Loans out

Released

Trial

Friendlies

Competitions

Overview

Premier League

League table

Results summary

Results by round

Results

Russian Cup

Round of 32

Knockout stage

Squad statistics

Appearances and goals

|-
|colspan="14"|Players away from the club on loan:

|-
|colspan="14"|Players who left CSKA Moscow during the season:

|}

Goal scorers

Clean sheets

Disciplinary record

References

PFC CSKA Moscow seasons
CSKA Moscow